Dunnet is a village in Caithness, Scotland

Dunnet may also refer to:

Places
 Dunnet's Corner, settlement in Markstay-Warren, Ontario, Canada
 Dunnet Forest, community woodland in Caithness
 Dunnet Head, the most northerly point of the Scottish mainland

People
 Desmond Dunnet (1913-1980), New Zealand cricketer
 George Dunnet (1928-1995), Scottish ornithologist and ecologist

Other uses
 Dunnet (video game), text adventure game
 SS Empire Dunnet, British cargo ship built in 1945, later known as Clan Mackinnon

See also 
 Dunnett